This is a list of the winning and nominated programs of the Primetime Emmy Award for Outstanding Original Main Title Theme Music. In the 1980s and early 1990s, the award was presented with the "possibility of one, more than one, or no award given," resulting in several years where there were nominees without a winner.

In the following list, the first titles listed in gold are the winners; those not in gold are nominees, which are listed in alphabetical order. The years given are those in which the ceremonies took place:



Winners and nominations

1980s

1990s

2000s

2010s

2020s

Individuals with multiple wins

2 wins
 Trevor Morris

Individuals with multiple nominations

7 nominations
 W. G. Snuffy Walden

5 nominations
 Jeff Beal

4 nominations
 Nathan Barr
 Sean Callery
 John Debney
 Mark Isham
 Mike Post

3 nominations
 Bruce Broughton
 Mychael Danna
 Lee Holdridge
 James Newton Howard
 Bear McCreary
 Thomas Newman

2 nominations
 Rachel Bloom
 Stanley Clarke
 Lisa Coleman
 Jeff Danna
 Ramin Djawadi
 Danny Elfman
 Jay Gruska
 Christopher Klatman
 Russ Landau
 Mark Leggett
 Stewart Levin
 Jeff Lippencott
 Joseph LoDuca
 Daniele Luppi
 Danny Lux
 Wendy Melvoin
 Trevor Morris
 Blake Neely
 Martin Phipps
 Adam Schlesinger
 David Schwartz
 Michael Skloff
 Mark Snow
 Jonathan Tunick
 Mark Williams

Programs with multiple wins
2 wins
 Monk

Programs with multiple nominations
2 nominations
 Chicago Hope
 Crazy Ex-Girlfriend
 Great Performances
 Monk

Notes

References

Film music awards
Original Main Title Theme Music